Streptomyces mashuensis is a bacterium species from the genus of Streptomyces which has been isolated from soil in Japan. Streptomyces mashuensis produces streptomycin, monazomycin.

See also 
 List of Streptomyces species

References

Further reading

External links
Type strain of Streptomyces mashuensis at BacDive -  the Bacterial Diversity Metadatabase

mashuensis
Bacteria described in 1991